Richard Christie may refer to:

 Richard Christy (born 1974), American drummer, radio personality and actor
 Richard Copley Christie (1830–1901), English lawyer, teacher, philanthropist and bibliophile

See also
Dick Christie (born 1948), American actor
Dick Christy (1935–1966), American football player